The Monument to the Heroes of Puente Sampayo is a memorial and sculptural group created by the Spanish sculptor Julio González Pola, in Pontevedra, Spain.

It is in the gardens of the Plaza de España and was inaugurated on 27 August 1911. The monument commemorates the courage of the people of Pontevedra led by the officer Pablo Morillo and their triumph over the Napoleonic troops of Marshal Michel Ney, liberating Pontevedra from the occupation of the French army on 7 and 8 June 1809.

History 
The Galician parliamentarian Eduardo Vincenti Reguera and the Galician Centre in Madrid were the main actors in the creation of the monument. On 9 February 1909, the Pontevedra City Council agreed to grant a subsidy of 500 pesetas and, later, authorised the contribution of the granite stone that supports the figures. This initiative was also supported by Javier Puig Llamas, mayor of Pontevedra at the time, and Eugenio Montero Ríos, president of the Senate. All these authorities made speeches at the inauguration of the monument on 27 August 1911.

The government of King Alfonso XIII, which donated the bronze needed for the sculpture, also awarded a medal to commemorate the Battle of Puente Sampayo. The contribution of many private individuals to the financing of the monument is also attested to.

The statue was surrounded by a monumental fountain built in 1983, which was removed in 2009 to return the monument and its surroundings to their original spatial design.

Description 
This sculptural group belongs to the Spanish commemorative sculpture movement of the early 20th century. 

The group is eight metres high. It consists of several bronze figures on a granite pedestal representing a group of farmers, soldiers and students led by officer Pablo Morillo, holding a flag in the final moments of the battle.

In the central part of the monument, a female figure (representing Galicia and the homeland) rests her hand on a shield with the Spanish coat of arms and extends her arm to invite combat. In the upper part, the figure of the officer Pablo Morillo encourages sword fighting. Next to him are a peasant, a student, a soldier and another wounded fighter representing the resistance of the people against the invader. Behind them is the flag and next to it a cannon.

In the corners of the lower part of the monument are the four coats of arms of the Galician provinces. The central granite construction symbolises one of the pillars of the Puente Sampayo bridge, where most of the battle took place and which was destroyed after the battle.

The sculptural group in popular culture 
It is considered by the art history professor Francisco Portela Sandoval to be one of the most successful monuments of the time due to its composition and faithful reproduction of the event it aims to immortalise.

Gallery

References

Bibliography 
 Gallego Esperanza, Mª de las Mercedes, 1996: La Escultura Pública en Pontevedra. Pontevedra, Diputación de Pontevedra, .
 Portela Sandoval, José, 1985: Julio González Pola y la escultura conmemorativa española en los albores del siglo XX, Boletín del Museo de Pontevedra. 
 Taboada, Roberto; Hermida, Arturo, 2009: O monumento ós héroes de Pontesampaio e o seu contorno, Pontevedra, Diputación de Pontevedra, .

See also

Related articles 
 Plaza de España (Pontevedra)
 Alameda de Pontevedra
 Battle of Puente Sampayo

External links 
  on the website Escultura Urbana
  on the website Galicia Máxica

Pontevedra
Spanish sculpture
Colossal statues
Bronze sculptures
Outdoor sculptures in Spain
Sculptures in Spain
20th-century sculptures
Tourist attractions in Galicia (Spain)
Monuments and memorials in Pontevedra
Sculptures in Pontevedra
Monuments and memorials in Galicia (Spain)